Qal'achai Kalon, formerly known as Kommunizm, is a village and jamoat in north-western Tajikistan. It is part of the city of Istaravshan in Sughd Region. The jamoat has a total population of 15,433 (2015).

Notes

References

Populated places in Sughd Region
Jamoats of Tajikistan